Farid Mostafavi, born 27 October 1954 in Tehran, Iran is an Iranian screenwriter best known for his social realist films set in urban Tehran, several of which were directed and co-written by Rakhshan Bani-Etemad.

Education
Mostafavi attended the "Institute of Cinema and Television" in 1979 and studied economics at Tehran University.

Career
His career in IRIB began in 1989 and later expanded to film. He has worked as writer and co-producer on "An Outlook to the Cinema", a thirteen-part television program about cinema (1983–1984), as assistant director on "The World Satirist", a ten-part television play (1984–1986), as voice-over writer for documentary films on "Centrality" (directed by Rakhshan Bani-Etemad) and "Immigrants" (directed by F. Shafaee), and as researcher and screenwriter on "Crossing from Iran Deserts", a documentary/fiction series (1997).

Filmography
 Kharej az Mahdudeh (1986 - aka Off-Limits)
 Payizan (1987)
 Rooz-e Bashokouh (1989 - aka The Grand Day)
 Zard-e Qanari (1988 - aka Canary Yellow)
 Pul-e Khareji (1989 - aka Foreign Currency)
 Omid (1991)
 Badal (1994 - aka The Stuntman)
 Roya-ye nime-shab-e tabestan (1994 - aka The Midnight Summer's Dream)
 Zir-e Pust-e Shahr (2001 - aka Under the Skin of the City)
 Zendan-e Zanan (2002 - aka Women's Prison)
 Zahr-e Asal (2003 - aka Honey Bane)
 Gilane (2005) 
 Taghato (2006 - aka Crossroads)
 Asr-e Jome (2006 - aka Friday Evening)
 Khunbazi (2006 - aka Mainline)
 Zaadboom (2009 - aka Birthplace)
 Ghesseh-ha (2014 - aka Tales)
 Kafshhaiam Koo? (2016 - aka Where Are My Shoes?)

Honors and awards
 Best Screenplay Award, House of Cinema Festival (for Women's Prison)
 Best Screenplay Award, House of Cinema Festival (for Crossroads, with Abolhassan Davoudi)
 Best Screenplay Award, International Fajr Film Festival (for Khunbazi, with Rakhshan Bani-Etemad, Mohsen Abdolvahab and Naghmeh Samini)
 Best Screenplay Award, International Fajr Film Festival (for Birthplace, with Abolhassan Davoudi)
 Best Screenplay Award, 71st Venice International Film Festival (for Tales, with Rakhshan Bani-Etemad)

References

External links
 

Iranian screenwriters
University of Tehran alumni
People from Tehran
1954 births
Living people
Crystal Simorgh for Best Screenplay winners